= Mountain Sounds =

US-Guatemalan musical duo

Mountain Sounds is a music project of Tim Hoyt and Franc Castillejos, Their debut album was self-produced in an unused orphanage in the Cerro Alux Mountains near Guatemala City in Guatemala.

Their debut album, Mountain Sounds, was mixed by Matt Wilbur and mastered by Troy Glessner. The first track from the album, "Lion or the Bee, was premiered by Rolling Stone as a Daily Download. The full album was made available by Beats Per Minute in advance of its official release date of March 26, 2013.
